Tyrone is an unincorporated community located in Las Animas County, Colorado, United States.  The U.S. Post Office at Model (ZIP Code 81059) now serves Tyrone postal addresses.

A post office called Tyrone was established in 1929, and remained in operation until 1968. The origin of the name Tyrone is obscure.

Geography 
Tyrone is located at  (37.454284,-104.204121).

References 

Unincorporated communities in Las Animas County, Colorado
Unincorporated communities in Colorado